A Fighting Heart is a 1924 American silent action film directed by Jack Nelson and starring Frank Merrill, Margaret Landis and Otto Lederer.

Cast
 Frank Merrill as 	Jack Melford
 Margaret Landis as 	Rae Davis
 Milburn Morante as 	Cloudy Day
 May Sherman as 	Julia Cunningham
 Otto Lederer as 	Dr. Logan
 Alphonse Martell as 	Dr. Dehli
 Cathleen Calhoun as 	Blanche Renault

References

Bibliography
 Connelly, Robert B. The Silents: Silent Feature Films, 1910-36, Volume 40, Issue 2. December Press, 1998.
 Munden, Kenneth White. The American Film Institute Catalog of Motion Pictures Produced in the United States, Part 1. University of California Press, 1997.

External links
 

1924 films
1920s action films
American silent feature films
American action films
American black-and-white films
Films directed by Jack Nelson
1920s English-language films
1920s American films